Lectionary 132, designated by siglum ℓ 132 (in the Gregory-Aland numbering) is a Greek manuscript of the New Testament, on parchment leaves. Palaeographically it has been assigned to the 14th century.

Description 

The codex contains Lessons from the Gospels  lectionary (Evangelistarium) with a large lacuna at the end. 53 leaves of the codex survived. It is written on parchment in Greek minuscule letters, in one columns per page, 13 lines per page. Written in silver.

History 

The manuscript was bought by Francesco Accida from Messina in 1583 and presented by him for Cardinal Sirlet. 
The manuscript was added to the list of New Testament manuscripts by Scholz. 
It was examined by Scholz and Gregory. 

The manuscript is not cited in the critical editions of the Greek New Testament (UBS3).

Currently the codex is located in the Vatican Library (Ottob. gr. 326) in Rome.

See also 

 List of New Testament lectionaries
 Biblical manuscript
 Textual criticism

Notes and references

Bibliography 

 J. M. A. Scholz, Biblisch-kritische Reise in Frankreich, der Schweiz, Italien, Palästine und im Archipel in den Jahren 1818, 1819, 1820, 1821: Nebst einer Geschichte des Textes des Neuen Testaments.

Greek New Testament lectionaries
14th-century biblical manuscripts
Manuscripts of the Vatican Library